Luoyang or Loyang is a prefecture-level city in Henan Province, China.

Luoyang or Loyang may also refer to:

 Loyang, Singapore, an area of Singapore
 Luoyang, Boluo County, Guangdong, China
 Luoyang River, a river in Fujian, China
 Luoyang Bridge (Quanzhou), a famed bridge across the Luoyang River in Quanzhou

Entertainment 
 Luoyang, a 2021 Chinese television series

Other uses
 ROCS Lo Yang, the name of multiple destroyers of the Republic of China Navy:
 ROCS Lo Yang (DD-14) (Benson class), previously USS Benson
 ROCS Lo Yang (DD-14) (Allen M. Sumner class), previously USS Taussig